Ultapani Reserve Forest is a biodiversity area situated under Holtugaon Forest Division of Manas Biosphere reserve situated in Kokrajhar district, Assam, India.

The name means "The Reverse Water", the river which flows through the forest in the direction west to east unlikely other rivers flows east to west. It is located in Kokrajhar Tehsil of Kokrajhar district in Assam, India. It is situated 55 km away from Kokrajhar, which is both district & sub-district headquarter of Ultapani Forest.

Fauna 

The Ultapani reserve forest plays a very important part of the Manas Biosphere Reserve. The forest type of Ultapani is a unique one which comprises mostly semi evergreen and moist deciduous type. The plants are basically evergreen and semi evergreen. Among these some plants have medicinal values, some are edible fruits, while, some of them are oil and timber yielding plants with great economic prospects. Ultapani is the "Haven of Butterfly" and the natural home of Golden langur, famous Great Pied Hornbill and some other RET species. Orchids are also the strength of Ultapani Reserve Forest. But, unfortunately the valuable asset of this forest is now threatened due to over exploitation of forest resources by forest mafias and encroachment for agricultural and human settlements by economically poor People in the forest lands living there in. Which creates lots of problems to the wild animals and it will effect adversely to the ecological balance. This paper highlighting upon the present status of conservation, richness of Biodiversity and tourism of Ultapani Reserve Forest.

References

Reserved forests of India
Protected areas of Assam
Kokrajhar district
Protected areas with year of establishment missing